Sceloporus variabilis, commonly known as the rosebelly lizard,  is a species of lizard, which is endemic to Mexico.

Geographic range
It is endemic to Mexico.

Description
S. variabilis is one of the smaller species of the genus Sceloporus.

Dorsally, it is tan or olive, with a double series of dark brown spots.  There are two yellowish dorsolateral stripes, one at each side of the back. Males are darker on the side below the dorsolateral stripe. Ventrally, it is dirty white or yellowish. Males have a large pink blotch on each side of the belly, which is bordered with dark blue, and they also have a black mark on the axilla.

The supraoculars are small, and they are bordered medially by a row of small scales, which prevent them from contacting the median head shields. The dorsal scales are keeled, pointed, and spiny. There are 58-69 dorsal scales from the interparietal shield to the base of the tail. A postfemoral pocket is present.  Males have 10-14 femoral pores.

References

Further reading
 Boulenger, G.A. 1885. Catalogue of the Lizards in the British Museum (Natural History). Second Edition. Volume II. Iguanidæ,... Trustees of the British Museum (Natural History). (Taylor and Francis, Printers.) London. xiii + 497 pp. + Plates I.- XXIV. (Sceloporus variabilis, pp. 236–237.)
 Wiegmann, A.F.A. 1834. Herpetologia Mexicana, seu descriptio amphibiorum Novae Hispaniae, quae itineribus comitis de Sack, Ferdinandi Deppe et Chr. Guil. Schiede in Museum Zoologicum Berolinense pervenerunt. Pars prima, Saurorum species amplectens, adiecto Systematis Saurorum Prodromo, additisque multis in hunc amphibiorum ordinem observationibus. C.G. Lüderitz. Berlin. iv + 54 pp. + 10 Plates. (Sceloporus variabilis, p. 51.)

External links

Rosebelly Lizard in Nicaragua

Sceloporus
Reptiles of Central America
Reptiles of Mexico
Reptiles of Guatemala
Taxa named by Arend Friedrich August Wiegmann
Reptiles described in 1834